Mahmoud Makhlof  (born April 17, 1975) is an Egyptian former professional football who played as a defender. He was a member of the Libya national football team.

External links

Player profile with Photo – Sporting-heroes.net
Player profile – MTN Africa Cup of Nations 2006

1975 births
Living people
Libyan footballers
Association football defenders
Libya international footballers
2006 Africa Cup of Nations players